Robert William Thomson PRSSA FRSE (29 June 1822–8 March 1873) was a Scottish inventor known for inventing the fountain pen and the pneumatic tyre.

Life

He was born on 29 June 1822 in Stonehaven in the northeast of Scotland, He was baptised into the Church of Scotland on 26 July 1822. Robert was the eleventh of twelve children of a local woolen mill owner. His family wished him to study for the ministry, but Robert refused, one reason being his inability to master Latin. Robert left school at the age of 14 and went to live with an uncle in Charleston, United States, where he was apprenticed to a merchant. Two years later he returned home and taught himself chemistry, electricity and astronomy with the help of a local weaver who had knowledge of mathematics.

Robert's father gave him a workshop, and by the time he was 17 years old he had rebuilt his mother's washing mangle so that the wet linen could be passed through the rollers in either direction, had successfully designed and built a ribbon saw, and had completed the first working model of his elliptic rotary steam engine which he perfected in later life. He served an engineering apprenticeship in Aberdeen and Dundee before joining a civil engineering company in Glasgow. He then went to work for an Edinburgh firm of civil engineers where he devised a new method of detonating explosive charges by the use of electricity, thus greatly reducing the loss of lives in mines throughout the world.

Thomson next worked as a railway engineer and supervised the blasting of chalk cliffs near Dover for the South Eastern Railway. Soon he set up his own railway consultancy business and proposed the line for the Eastern Counties Railway which was accepted by Parliament and eventually developed.

Thomson was 23 years old when he patented his pneumatic tyre. He was granted a patent in France in 1846 and in the US in 1847. His tyre consisted of a hollow belt of India-rubber inflated with air so that the wheels presented "a cushion of air to the ground, rail or track on which they run". This elastic belt of rubberized canvas was enclosed within a strong outer casing of leather which was bolted to the wheel. Thomson's "Aerial Wheels" were demonstrated in London's Regent's Park in March 1847 and were fitted to several horse-drawn carriages, greatly improving the comfort of travel and reducing noise. One set ran for 1200 miles without a sign of deterioration.

In 1849 he invented the fountain pen.

In 1863 he was elected a Fellow of the Royal Society of Edinburgh, his proposer being Charles Piazzi Smyth. From 1869 to 1871 he served as president of the Royal Scottish Society of Arts.

He amassed a large sum from his inventions and lived in a huge townhouse at 3 Moray Place on the Moray Estate in west Edinburgh.

He died at home in Edinburgh on 8 March 1873 aged 50. He was buried in Dean Cemetery in west Edinburgh on the path leading from the centre of the cemetery to the south-west.

Family

Thomson married Clara Hertz (daughter of a diamond merchant) on the island of Java. They had two sons and two daughters including Courtauld Thomson and Elspeth, wife of Wind in the Willows author Kenneth Grahame. His wife survived him and remarried in 1875 to John Fletcher Moulton (later Lord Moulton) and died in 1888.

Patents and developments
 Pneumatic tyre ( see US Patent 5104 )
 Writing and drawing instruments (the self-filling pen)
 Improvements in obtaining and applying motive power
 Dividing hard substances such as rock stone and coal
 Steam boilers
 Improvements in steam gauges
 Steam omnibuses
 Applying steam power in cultivating land
 Elastic wheel tyres
 Road steamers
 Guiding road steamers on street tramways
 Elastic belts, seats and other supports or cushions.

Thomson was also the originator of:
 The washing mangle with reversible mangles
 The ribbon saw
 Elliptical rotary engine
 Use of electricity to detonate explosive charges
 Machinery for sugar manufacturing
 The portable steam crane
 Hydraulic dry dock

Honours
In 2020 he was inducted into the Scottish Engineering Hall of Fame.

References

External links

1822 births
1873 deaths
People from Stonehaven
Scottish inventors
Steam road vehicles
Burials at the Dean Cemetery
19th-century Scottish people
British railway entrepreneurs
19th-century Scottish businesspeople